Sheikha Maitha bint Mohammed bin Rashid Al Maktoum (born 5 March 1980) is a karate, taekwondo, polo athlete and Sheikha of Dubai. She was the first woman from UAE to represent the country in the Olympics in 2008.

Personal life
Sheikha Maitha is the daughter of Sheikh Mohammed bin Rashid Al Maktoum, the Vice President and Prime Minister of the United Arab Emirates (UAE), and ruler of the Emirate of Dubai. Her mother is an Algerian, Houria Ahmed Lamara. She is the sister of Sheikha Shamsa, Sheikha Latifa, and Sheikh Majid. 

She was appointed as a board member of the Global Initiative Foundation in December 2015.

Sports career
In 2000, Sheikha Maitha began her martial arts career. In 2004, she won the karate 65-kg class at the 10th Pan Arab Games and became the first UAE woman to win an international gold medal.

Representing the United Arab Emirates in the 2006 Asian Games, she won the silver medal at the Women's Over 60 Kilogram karate event. In 2007, she won another gold medal at the 11th Pan Arab Games in Cairo.

In March 2008, the UAE National Olympic Committee announced Sheikha Maitha's participation at the 2008 Summer Olympics, making her the first woman to represent the UAE carrying the national flag. She participated in taekwondo in the 67 kg category for women.

In March 2011, she participated in the GCC Women's Sports Championships in Abu Dhabi and won the gold medal in Taekwondo.

Sheikha Maitha started playing women's polo at the age of 32 as injuries prevented her from continuing martial arts.

She participated with her team in the IFZA Silver Cup 2021 and advanced to the semi-finals. At the Polo Masters Cup 2021 and the Dubai Polo Challenge 2021 Sheikha Maitha led her UAE team to victory.

Accolades and awards
In 2007, Sheikha Maitha was named Arab Sports woman of the Year for winning the silver medal at the 2006 Asian Games.

In December 2007, she was the first Arab woman to receive the World Fair Play Award in Paris, France.

In 2008, she was included as 17th on the list of the "20 Hottest Young Royals" as compiled by Forbes magazine.

Ancestry

References

Living people
1980 births
Maitha
Emirati female taekwondo practitioners
Emirati female karateka
Taekwondo practitioners at the 2008 Summer Olympics
Olympic taekwondo practitioners of the United Arab Emirates
Emirati princesses
People from Dubai
Asian Games medalists in karate
Royal Olympic participants
Karateka at the 2002 Asian Games
Karateka at the 2006 Asian Games
Asian Games silver medalists for the United Arab Emirates
Medalists at the 2006 Asian Games
Daughters of monarchs